Luke Anthony Cleve Medley (born 21 June 1989) is an English footballer who plays as a striker for Erith & Belvedere.

As a junior, he was on the books of Welwyn Garden City, Barnet and Tottenham Hotspur. He joined Bradford City in 2007, and later the same year scored with his first touch in league football. He played on loan for Cambridge City, but left Bradford after just one season to return to London, and re-signed for Barnet. During his time with Barnet, he had loan spells twice at Havant & Waterlooville and Woking before he dropped back into non-league to sign for Mansfield Town, Kidderminster Harriers and Bromley.

Career

Early career
Born in Greenwich, London, Medley attended Southgate College, where he played for the college football side which lost in the 2006 English Colleges' Football League Championship Final to Gateshead College. Medley also played for Welwyn Garden City, making his debut at the age of 16. During his time with Welwyn Garden City, the club was removed from the 2005–06 Football Association Challenge Vase competition, after Medley played against Newmarket Town despite being not registered by the qualification date.

Medley left Welwyn Garden City in 2006 to join Barnet's London-based Protec Football Academy, where he stayed for eight months, before graduating to the youth side of Premier League's Tottenham Hotspur, along with defender Chris Casey. Medley was released by Tottenham and was instead picked up by Bradford City under the caretaker management of David Wetherall following a trial.

Bradford City
Medley scored the winning goal on his Bradford debut in their 2–1 league victory over Wrexham on 25 August 2007, a volley from outside the area, just two minutes after coming on as a substitute. The goal was scored with his first touch on his professional first team debut. He played another three games before he joined Cambridge City on loan on 11 January 2008. He came close to scoring on his Cambridge debut the following day, when he struck the post in a 1–0 FA Trophy defeat to Droylsden, with his Bradford teammate Sean Taylforth on the opposing side. Medley played six games during his loan spell, including five in the Conference South, but failed to score.

He returned to Bradford and made several more appearances as a substitute. On 29 April 2008, Medley was offered a new contract to remain at Bradford, having played eight games for the club. Four days later, he scored on his first start for the club, when he converted a 44th-minute penalty against Wycombe Wanderers on the final day of the 2007–08 season. However, he decided to turn down City's contract offer, because he wanted to move closer to his London roots. He had scored two goals from just nine games during his time with Bradford.

Barnet
Less than three weeks later, Medley returned to former club Barnet, becoming the League Two side's first signing of the summer. Barnet eventually had to pay Bradford City £7,500 for Medley following a tribunal hearing. He made his Barnet debut on the opening day of the 2008–09 as a second-half substitute against Chesterfield. Barnet lost the game 3–1. Medley's first goal for Barnet came in his eighth league game, as they defeated Rotherham United 4–3 despite playing the game with ten men for an hour. It was Medley's only goal from 20 appearances in all competitions, including 17 in the league, before Christmas; he was subsequently dropped from the team and found more competition for places when Barnet signed 40-year-old striker Paul Furlong.

After failing to play for Barnet during 2009, he was loaned out to Conference South side Havant & Waterlooville in March for one month. Medley's debut came just one day after signing as he helped Havant to defeat Weston-super-Mare 1–0 in their fight against relegation, with Medley coming close to scoring. He scored his first goal for Havant on his home debut during a 3–3 draw with Maidenhead United. His second goal came in a 3–0 win over Fisher Athletic.

In July 2009, he joined Conference South side Woking on a six-month loan. Medley made his debut in the opening day of the season in Woking's first-ever game in the Conference South—a game they won 2–1, before scoring his first goal in the club's second game just three days later against Chelmsford City, which Woking went on to lose. He returned to the side and scored his first FA Cup goal to help Woking defeat Maidstone United and put them just one round away from the full stages of the competition. In February 2010, he rejoined Havant & Waterlooville on loan. He played 13 games during his loan spell but failed to score. Medley returned to Barnet in April and made his first appearance for the Bees in almost a year against Accrington Stanley. However, Medley was one of a number of players that Barnet released at the end of the season.

Mansfield Town
Medley spent time on trial with Histon, Gillingham and Conference National-side Mansfield Town, before signing for the latter on a six-month deal thanks to fans group the 12th Stags, which helped to pay for some of his wages. Medley was a second-half substitute for Keigan Parker when making his debut for Mansfield in a 3–1 victory against Forest Green Rovers on the opening day of the 2010–11 Conference season. A week later, he scored his first goal and made another as Mansfield defeated Kidderminster Harriers 3–1. Medley had come on at half-time in the game, with Mansfield one goal down, and his performance was described as one that "terrified Kidderminster with his power and pace". After three appearances as substitute, Medley was rewarded for his display against Kidderminster by being given his first start for Mansfield in their next game, which finished in a 1–1 draw with Kettering Town. Medley remained a squad member but was still regularly used as a substitute and in one such appearance at the end of September, he scored twice in a game for the first time, to help lift Mansfield to the top of the table. Medley's contract was also extended to the end of the season following a club takeover.

Kidderminster Harriers
Medley left Mansfield in the summer and joined Kidderminster Harriers on a one-year contract. On 17 November 2011, Medley joined fellow Conference side Lincoln City on loan until the New Year. After making six substitute appearances for the Imps, he returned to Kidderminster Harriers following the completion of his loan contract. On 10 January 2012, he joined Woking for a second time on a month's loan.

Bromley
Medley left Kidderminster on 14 February 2012 when his contract was cancelled by mutual consent and on the same day he joined Bromley.

Hayes and Yeading United
He joined Hayes & Yeading in the summer of 2013 to boost the United attack for the forthcoming campaign. On 20 July 2013 he made his debut during pre-season for his new team, scoring one goal in the 2–1 defeat to Windsor. He then featured again in the 3–1 victory over Slough Town. After four league appearances, he left the club.

Goole
Medley signed for Northern Premier League Division One South side Goole in October 2013. He made six appearances, without scoring, before being released.

Crawley Down Gatwick
In November 2013, Medley signed for Crawley Down Gatwick of the Isthmian League Division One South, making his debut against Redhill on 30 November.

Margate
In March 2014, Medley joined Margate of the Isthmian League Premier Division. He made his debut for the club on 15 March against Billericay Town.

Walton Casuals
Medley later joined Walton Casuals in October 2014, and made his debut in the Isthmian League Cup First Round.

Chatham Town
Medley began the 2016–17 season at Chatham Town, scoring 15 goals in a struggling side.

Cray Wanderers
He transferred to Chatham's local rivals Cray Wanderers in January 2017 and made an immediate impact, scoring six times in three games in the first week of February.

Personal life
Luke is the older brother of professional footballer Zechariah Medley.

Career statistics

References

External links

Lincoln City F.C. Official Archive Profile

1989 births
Living people
Footballers from Greenwich
English footballers
English football managers
Association football forwards
Welwyn Garden City F.C. players
Barnet F.C. players
Tottenham Hotspur F.C. players
Bradford City A.F.C. players
Cambridge City F.C. players
Havant & Waterlooville F.C. players
Woking F.C. players
Mansfield Town F.C. players
Aldershot Town F.C. players
Kidderminster Harriers F.C. players
Lincoln City F.C. players
Bromley F.C. players
Hayes & Yeading United F.C. players
Goole A.F.C. players
Margate F.C. players
Crawley Down Gatwick F.C. players
Walton Casuals F.C. players
Chatham Town F.C. players
Cray Wanderers F.C. players
Greenwich Borough F.C. managers
Sheppey United F.C. players
Croydon F.C. players
Lordswood F.C. players
Whitstable Town F.C. players
Erith & Belvedere F.C. players
English Football League players
National League (English football) players
Northern Premier League players
Isthmian League players